Matthew Bernard Herkenhoff (born April 2, 1951) is a former American football offensive tackle in the National Football League. He played for the Kansas City Chiefs between 1976 and 1985.

1951 births
Living people
People from Melrose, Minnesota
American football offensive tackles
Minnesota Golden Gophers football players
Kansas City Chiefs players
Players of American football from Minnesota